Gilberto Lozano Cortés (born 27 January 1995) is a Colombian footballer who currently plays as a defender for 1º Dezembro.

Career statistics

Club

Notes

References

1995 births
Living people
Colombian footballers
Colombian expatriate footballers
Association football defenders
Campeonato de Portugal (league) players
Deportes Tolima footballers
Colombian expatriate sportspeople in Portugal
Expatriate footballers in Portugal
People from Palmira, Valle del Cauca
Sportspeople from Valle del Cauca Department